Dancing on Coral is a Miles Franklin Award-winning novel by Australian author Glenda Adams.

Awards

Miles Franklin Literary Award, 1987: winner<ref>
New South Wales Premier's Literary Awards, Christina Stead Prize for Fiction, 1987: winner

Notes

Parts of this novel first appeared in Lies and Stories and The Hottest Night of the Century.

References

External links
Middlemiss.org

1987 Australian novels
Miles Franklin Award-winning works
Angus & Robertson books